Johann Konrad Valentin Ritter von Kaim (28 November 1737 (baptised) – 16 February 1801) was a French soldier and Austrian infantry commander during the French Revolutionary Wars. He was mortally wounded at the Battle of Pozzolo on Christmas Day 1800, but did not die until several weeks later. He was born in Gengenbach and died in Udine.

Footnotes

Austrian Empire military leaders of the French Revolutionary Wars
Austrian knights
1737 births
1801 deaths